Orient Express (German: Orientexpress) is a 1927 German silent thriller film directed by Wilhelm Thiele and starring Lil Dagover, Heinrich George and Angelo Ferrari.

The film's sets were designed by the art director Hans Baluschek and Karl Machus.

Cast
 Lil Dagover as Beate von Morton  
 Heinrich George as Peter Karg 
 Angelo Ferrari as Vicomte Antoine d'Arcier 
 Walter Rilla as Allan Wilton 
 Maria Paudler as Mimi  
 Hilde Jennings as Lisbeth  
 Uwe Jens Krafft as Brauereibesitzer Müller 
 Gyula Szőreghy 
 Iris Arlan 
 Georg Guertler
 Max Maximilian
 Neumann-Schuler

References

Bibliography
 Waldman, Harry & Slide, Anthony. Hollywood and the Foreign Touch: A Dictionary of Foreign Filmmakers and Their Films from America, 1910-1995. Scarecrow Press, 1996.

External links

1927 films
Films of the Weimar Republic
Films directed by Wilhelm Thiele
German silent feature films
Films set on the Orient Express
Films with screenplays by Wilhelm Thiele
German black-and-white films
German thriller films
1920s thriller films
Phoebus Film films
Silent thriller films
1920s German films